Margaret Mary Carpenter (born  in Detroit, Michigan) was a Republican member of the North Carolina House of Representatives from the fifty-second district (Madison, Haywood, Graham, Swain, and part of Jackson counties) for one term (2001–2002). Carpenter, a resident of Waynesville, North Carolina, defeated Haywood County Commissioner and former Hazelwood Mayor, Mary Ann Enloe, by a narrow margin in 2000.

Carpenter was defeated by Mars Hill Mayor Ray Rapp for the newly drawn 118th district (Haywood, Madison, and Yancey counties) in 2002.

She is the daughter-in law of former State Senator Bob Carpenter of Macon County.

Electoral history

2006

2004

2002

2000

References

External links

1950 births
Living people
People from Detroit
Politicians from Detroit
People from Waynesville, North Carolina
University of Alabama alumni
University of South Alabama alumni
Educators from North Carolina
20th-century American women
21st-century American politicians
21st-century American women politicians
Women state legislators in North Carolina
Republican Party members of the North Carolina House of Representatives